Admete is a genus of medium-sized sea snails, marine gastropod molluscs in the family Cancellariidae, the nutmeg snails.

Species
According to the World Register of Marine Species (WoRMS), the following species with valid names are within the genus Admete :

 Admete bruuni Knudsen, 1964
 Admete californica (Dall, 1908) - California admete
 Admete choshiensis Shikama, 1962
 Admete clivicola Høisæter, 2011
 Admete contabulata Friele, 1879
 Admete enderbyensis Powell, 1958
 Admete frigida Rochebrune & Mabille, 1885
 Admete globularis E.A. Smith, 1875: synonym of Microglyphis globularis (E. A. Smith, 1875) (original combination)
 Admete gracilior (Carpenter, 1869) - slender admete
 Admete haini Numanami, 1996
 Admete hukuiensis Nomura, 1940
 Admete magellanica (Strebel, 1905)
 Admete microsoma (Dall, 1908)
 Admete ovata E.A. Smith, 1875
 Admete philippii Ihering, 1907
 Admete sadko Gorbunov, 1946
 Admete schythei (Philippi, 1855)
 Admete solida (Aurivillius, 1885)
 Admete specularis (Watson, 1882)
 Admete tabulata Sowerby III, 1875
 Admete tenuissima Okutani & Fujikura, 2002
 Admete verenae Harasewych & Petit, 2011
 Admete viridula (Fabricius, 1780) - northern admete)
 Admete watanabei Shikama, 1962

 Names that have become synonyms 

 Admete aethiopica Thiele, 1925: synonym of Cancellicula aethiopica (Thiele, 1925)
 Admete ambigua Hutton, 1885: synonym of Leucotina casta (A. Adams, 1853)
 Admete antarctica (Strebel, 1908): synonym of Nothoadmete antarctica (Strebel, 1908)
 Admete arctica (Middendorff, 1849): synonym of Neoiphinoe arctica (Middendorff, 1849)
 Admete azorica Bouchet & Warén, 1985: synonym of Brocchinia azorica (Bouchet & Warén, 1985)
 Admete borealis A. Adams, 1855: synonym of Admete viridula (Fabricius, 1780)
 Admete cancellata Kobelt, 1887: synonym of Neadmete cancellata (Kobelt, 1887)
 Admete circumcincta (Dall, 1873): synonym of Neadmete circumcincta (Dall, 1873)
 Admete consobrina Powell, 1951: synonym of Nothoadmete consobrina (Powell, 1951)
 Admete cornidei Altimira, 1978: synonym of Bonellitia cornidei (Altimira, 1978)
 Admete couthouyi (Jay, 1839) - northern admete: synonym of Admete viridula (Fabricius, 1780)
 Admete crispa Møller, 1842: synonym of Admete viridula (Fabricius, 1780)
 Admete decapensis Barnard, 1960: synonym of Brocchinia decapensis (Barnard, 1960)
 Admete delicatula E.A. Smith, 1907: synonym of Nothoadmete delicatula (E.A. Smith, 1907)
 Admete distincta Leche, 1878: synonym of Admete viridula (Fabricius, 1780)
 Admete finlayi (Powell, 1940): synonym of Zeadmete finlayi Powell, 1940
 Admete grandis Mørch, 1869: synonym of Admete viridula (Fabricius, 1780)
 Admete harpovoluta Powell, 1957: synonym of Nothoadmete harpovoluta (Powell, 1957) (original combination)
 Admete laevior Leche, 1878: synonym of Admete viridula (Fabricius, 1780)
 Admete limnaeaeformis E.A. Smith, 1879: synonym of Toledonia limnaeaeformis (E.A. Smith, 1879)
 Admete microscopica Dall, 1889: synonym of Microcancilla microscopica (Dall, 1889)
 Admete middendorffiana Dall, 1885 accepted as Admete viridula (Fabricius, 1780)
 Admete modesta (Carpenter, 1864): synonym of Neadmete modesta (Carpenter, 1864)
 Admete nodosa Verrill and Smith, 1885: synonym of Brocchinia nodosa (Verrill & S. Smith, 1885)
 Admete philippii Carcelles, 1950 accepted as Admete philippii Ihering, 1907
 Admete producta Sars, 1878: synonym of Admete viridula (Fabricius, 1780)
 Admete regina Dall, 1911 - noble admete: synonym of Admete solida (Aurivillius, 1885)
 Admete rhyssa Dall, 1919: synonym of Admete gracilior (Carpenter in Gabb, 1869) 
 Admete seftoni Berry, 1956: synonym of Admete gracilior (Carpenter in Gabb, 1869) 
 Admete stricta Hedley, 1907: synonym of Pepta stricta (Hedley, 1907)
 Admete unalashkensis (Dall, 1873): synonym of Neadmete unalashkensis (Dall, 1873)
 Admete undata Leche, 1878: synonym of Admete viridula (Fabricius, 1780)
 Admete undatocostata Verkrüzen, 1875: synonym of Admete viridula (Fabricius, 1780)
 Admete woodworthi Dall, 1905: synonym of Admete gracilior (Carpenter in Gabb, 1869)

References

 
 Powell A. W. B., New Zealand Mollusca, William Collins Publishers Ltd, Auckland, New Zealand 1979 
 Gofas, S.; Le Renard, J.; Bouchet, P. (2001). Mollusca, in: Costello, M.J. et al. (Ed.) (2001). European register of marine species: a check-list of the marine species in Europe and a bibliography of guides to their identification. Collection Patrimoines Naturels, 50: pp. 180–213
 Hemmen J. (2007). Recent Cancellariidae. Wiesbaden, 428pp.
 Høisæter T. (2011) Revision of the Cancellariidae (Gastropoda: Caenogastropoda) in the deep water of the Norwegian Sea, with the description of a new species of Admete. Journal of the Marine Biological Association of the United Kingdom 91: 493–504

Cancellariidae
Gastropod genera
Taxa named by Henrik Nikolai Krøyer